Henry Elbert Hildebrand (July 21, 1867 – November 14, 1931) was an American college football coach. He is credited with being the head football coach at Texas Christian University (TCU) in 1902, although it is unclear how many games he coached.

Head coaching record

References

1867 births
1931 deaths
TCU Horned Frogs football coaches
People from Fayette County, Texas